Delia Beatriz De la Cruz Delgado (born December 20, 1949), known professionally as Macaria, is a Mexican actress.

Biography
Delia De la Cruz was born in Mexico City. When she was one year old, her mother took her to Havana, Cuba, where she was raised by her grandparents until her mother brought her back to Mexico at age six. In school she initially studied teaching, before changing focus to dancing and singing. She adopted the stage name Macaria after originating a character with that name on the television program Happening a go go.

She has acted in numerous telenovelas, TV programs, films, and plays, including the sitcom Vecinos and the telenovela Un gancho al corazón.

She has had romantic relationships with guitarist , entertainer Gualberto Castro, and comedian Polo Polo. Bátiz is the father of her son, whom she raised along with Gualberto Castro.

Filmography

Telenovelas

Awards and nominations
 33rd TVyNovelas Awards (2015) - nominated for Best Co-lead Actress

References

External links
 

1949 births
Actresses from Mexico City
Living people
Mexican film actresses
Mexican musical theatre actresses
Mexican telenovela actresses